Lilli Henoch (26 October 1899 – 8 September 1943) was a German track and field athlete who set four world records and won 10 German national championships, in four different disciplines.

Henoch set world records in the discus (twice), the shot put, and the 4 × 100 meters relay events. She also won German national championships in the shot put four times, the 4 × 100 meters relay three times, the discus twice, and the long jump. She was Jewish, and during the Holocaust she and her mother were deported and shot by the Nazis in the Riga Ghetto in September 1943.

Early life
Henoch was Jewish, and was born in Königsberg, East Prussia (Germany).  Her father, a businessman, died in 1912.  She and her family moved to Berlin, and her mother subsequently remarried.

Track and field career
Henoch set world records in the discus, shot put, and—with her teammates—4 × 100 meters relay events.

Between 1922 and 1926, she won 10 German national championships: in shot put, 1922–25; discus, 1923 and 1924; long jump, 1924; and 4 × 100 meters relay, 1924–26.

After World War I, Henoch joined the Berlin Sports Club (BSC), which was approximately one quarter Jewish.	She missed a chance to compete in the 1924 Summer Olympics, because Germany was not allowed to participate in the Games after World War I.  In 1924, she trained the women's section in Bar Kochba Berlin.  She was a member of the BSC hockey team, which won the Berlin Hockey Championship in 1925.

Discus
She set a world record in discus on 1 October 1922, with a distance of 24.90 meters. She bettered this on 8 July 1923, with a throw of 26.62 meters.  She won the German national championship in discus in 1923 and 1924, and won the silver medal in 1925.

Long jump
In 1924, Henoch won the German Long Jump Championship, having won the bronze medal in the event the prior year.

Shot put
On 16 August 1925 Henoch set a world shot put record with a throw of 11.57 meters. She won the German national championship in shot put in 1922–25, and won the silver medal in 1921 and 1926.

4 × 100 meters relay
In 1926, she ran the first leg on a 4 × 100 meters relay world record—50.40 seconds—in Cologne, breaking the prior record that had stood for 1,421 days by a full second.  She won the German national championship in the 4 × 100 meters relay in 1924–26.

100 meter dash
In 1924, she won the silver medal at 100 meters in the German national championships.

Post-Nazi-rise disruption of career
After Adolf Hitler came to power in 1933, Henoch and all other Jews were forced to leave the membership of the BSC, by the Nazi's new race laws.  She then joined the Jüdischer Turn-und Sportclub 1905 (Jewish Gymnastics and Sports Club 1905), which was limited to Jews, for which she played team handball and was a trainer.  She also became a gymnastics teacher at a Jewish elementary school.

Because she was Jewish, the German government did not allow her to participate in the 1936 Summer Olympics.

Killing
The Nazi German government deported Henoch, her 66-year-old mother, and her brother to the Riga Ghetto in Nazi Germany-occupied Latvia on 5 September 1942, during World War II.  She and her mother were taken from the ghetto and shot by an Einsatzgruppen mobile killing unit in September 1942, along with a large number of other Jews taken from the ghetto.  They were all buried in a mass grave near Riga, Latvia.  Her brother disappeared, without a trace.

Hall of Fame and commemoration
Henoch was inducted into the International Jewish Sports Hall of Fame in 1990.

In 2008, a Stolperstein was installed in her honor in front of her former residence in Berlin.

See also
List of select Jewish track and field athletes

References

Further reading
"Lilli Henoch. Fragmente aus dem Leben einer jüdischen Sportlerin und Turnlehrerin", Ehlert, Martin-Heinz, Sozial- und Zeitgeschichte des Sports, Volume 3, Issue 2, pages 34–48, 1989

External links

"Lilli Henoch and Martha Jacob – Two Jewish Athletes in Germany Before and After 1933", by Berno Bahroa, Sport in History, Volume 30, Issue 2, pages 267–87, 2010

1899 births
Sportspeople from Königsberg
People from East Prussia
German female shot putters
German national athletics champions
1943 deaths
German female discus throwers
German female long jumpers
German female sprinters
Athletes from Berlin
German female handball players
People who died in the Riga Ghetto
German civilians killed in World War II
German Jews who died in the Holocaust
Jewish German sportspeople
Violence against women in Germany
People executed by Nazi Germany by firing squad
20th-century German women